The 1918–19 NCAA men's basketball season began in December 1918, progressed through the regular season, and concluded in March 1919.

Season headlines 

 The 1918–19 season took place between the fall 1918 second surge and spring 1919 third surge of the so-called "Spanish flu" pandemic, forcing some schools to play shortened seasons or cancel their seasons. Young men leaving school for World War I military service also affected teams.
 In February 1943, the Helms Athletic Foundation retroactively selected Minnesota as its national champion for the 1918–19 season.
 In 1995, the Premo-Porretta Power Poll retroactively selected Navy as its national champion for the 1918–19 season.

Conference membership changes

Regular season

Conference winners

Statistical leaders

Awards

Helms College Basketball All-Americans 

The practice of selecting a Consensus All-American Team did not begin until the 1928–29 season. The Helms Athletic Foundation later retroactively selected a list of All-Americans for the 1918–19 season.

Major player of the year awards 

 Helms Player of the Year: Erling Platou, Minnesota (retroactive selection in 1944)

References